The Argos is a river in the region of Murcia, Spain. It is a tributary of the river Segura. It starts in Caravaca de la Cruz, runs through Cehegín, Valentin, and joins the Segura in Calasparra.

Rivers of Spain
Rivers of the Region of Murcia